The Ganges Canal or Ganga Canal is a canal system that irrigates the Doab region between the Ganges River and the Yamuna River in India.

The canal is primarily an irrigation canal, although parts of it were also used for navigation, primarily for its construction materials. Separate navigation channels with lock gates were provided on this system for boats to negotiate falls.  Originally constructed from 1842 to 1854, for an original head discharge of 6000 ft³/s, the Upper Ganges Canal has since been enlarged gradually for the present head discharge of 10,500 ft³/s (295 m³/s). The system consists of main canal of 272 miles and about 4000 miles long distribution channels. The canal system irrigates nearly 9,000 km² of fertile agricultural land in ten districts of Uttar Pradesh and Uttarakhand. Today the canal is the source of agricultural prosperity in much of these states, and the irrigation departments of these states actively maintain the canal against a fee system charged from users.

There are some small hydroelectric plants on the canal capable of generating about 33MW if running at full capacity these are at Nirgajini, Chitaura, Salawa, Bhola, Jani, Jauli and Dasna.

Structure

The canal is administratively divided into the Upper Ganges Canal from Haridwar to Aligarh, with some branches, and the Lower Ganges Canal which
constitutes several branches below Aligarh.

Upper Ganga Canal
The Upper Ganges canal is the important and the original Ganges Canal, which starts at the
Bhimgoda Barrage near Har ki Pauri at
Haridwar, traverses Roorkee, Purquazi, Sardhana (Meerut district), Muradnagar, Dasna, Bulandshahr, Khurja, Harduaganj and continues to Nanau (near Akrabad) in
Aligarh district, where it bifurcates into the
Kanpur branch and Etawah branch.

Lower Ganga Canal
A channel from Chaudhary Charan Singh  Ganga barrage at Narora (Bulandshahr district) intersects the canal system
48 km downstream from Nanau (Aligarh district), and continues past the Sengar River and Sersa River, past Shikohabad in Firozabad District to become the Bhognipur branch which was opened in 1880.  This branch, starting at
village Jera in Mainpuri district, runs for 166 km to reach Kanpur.
At kilometre 64 the Balrai escape carries excess water through a 6.4 km. channel through the ravines to discharge into the Yamuna.  This branch has 386 km. of distributary channels.

The Bhognipur branch, together with the Kanpur and Etawah branches, is known as the Lower Ganges Canal. The old channels of the old Kanpur and Etawah branches between Nanau and the point of intersection by the channel from Narora, are known as "stumps", and are utilized only when the supply of water in the lower Ganges system runs low. The main branch of the river passes Kanpur (behind IIT Kanpur campus) before breaking into several branches. A branch of it terminates Kanpur Jal Sansthan which comes from behind J. K. Temple.

History

An irrigation system was felt necessary after the disastrous Agra famine of 1837–38, in which nearly 800,000 people died, and nearly ten million rupees was spent on relief works, resulting in considerable loss of revenue to the British East India Company.  One of the moving forces behind the canal was Colonel Proby Cautley, who was confident that a 500-kilometre canal was feasible. There were many obstacles and objections to his project, mostly financial, but Cautley persevered and after spending six months walking and riding through the area taking measurements, he managed to persuade the British East India Company to sponsor the project.

Digging of the canal began in April 1842. Cautley had to make his own bricks, brick kiln and mortar. Initially, he was opposed by the Hindu priests at Haridwar, who felt that the waters of the holy river Ganges would be imprisoned but Cautley pacified them by agreeing to leave a gap in the dam from where the water could flow unchecked. He further appeased the priests by undertaking the repair of bathing ghats along the river. He also inaugurated the dam by the worship of Lord Ganesh, the god of good beginnings. The dam was faced with many complications- among them was the problem of the mountainous streams that threatened the canal. Near Roorkee, the land fell away sharply and Cautley had to build an aqueduct to carry the canal for half a kilometre. As a result, at Roorkee the canal is 25 metres higher than the original river.

In 1877 the whole canal system of the lower Doabs underwent radical alteration. The Lower Ganges Canal, with a feed from a channel from Narora, was constructed into the ghar tract of Etawah, and became the Bhognipur branch. Building of this canal also eventually led to the establishment of first engineering college in India, the College of Civil Engineering at Roorkee (Now Indian Institute of Technology, Roorkee).

Further reading

References

External links

 History of Irrigation in Uttar Pradesh

Ganges
Kanpur
Haridwar
Geography of Uttarakhand
Canals in Uttar Pradesh
Canals opened in 1854
1854 establishments in India